The Romanesque Road is a scenic route in the German state of Saxony-Anhalt in central-east Germany. It is part of the Transromanica network, a major European Cultural Route since 2006.

Route
The route takes the form of a figure-of-eight, with a northern and a southern loop, and the city of Magdeburg as its centre, linking village churches, monasteries, cathedrals and castles built between 950 and 1250 and which therefore represent the emergence of Christianity in this part of Germany. Their Romanesque architecture can be recognised by its angular shapes and the round arches of the windows and doors as shown on the official Romanesque Road signs. As well as the specific Romanesque stops en route, there are other villages and churches to explore.

Major places of interest

Magdeburg
Cathedral
Unser Lieben Frauen monastery
St Peter's Church
St Sebastian's Church

Northern Route

Southern Route

As an incentive to raise the profile and support the economy along the Romanesque Road in the Saxony-Anhalt region there is an annual competition for the 'Romanesque Prize', worth €10,000.

See also
List of regional characteristics of Romanesque churches 
Romanesque art
Route Romane d'Alsace

References

External links
  Official website 

 
German tourist routes
Tourist attractions in Saxony-Anhalt
Romanesque architecture